Ichhapur (archaic spelling Ichapore or Ishapore) may refer to the following:

Ichapore, a neighbourhood in North Barrackpur municipality in Barrackpore subdivision, North 24 Parganas district, West Bengal, India
Ichapore Arsenal / Rifle Factory Ishapore, arms manufacturing unit in North 24 Parganas district, West Bengal, India
Ichhapur Defence Estate, a census town in Barrackpore I CD Block in Barrackpore subdivision, North 24 Parganas district, West Bengal, India
Ichhapur railway station, in North 24 district, West Bengal, India
Ichhapur, Paschim Bardhaman, a census town in Durgapur subdivision, Paschim Bardhaman district, West Bengal, India